The following is a list of circuits that have hosted International Motor Sports Association (IMSA) SportsCar Championship races from the inaugural season in 1971 up to and including the 2020 season.  The list includes the combined IMSA history of races held as part of the IMSA GT Championship, the Grand-Am Rolex Sports Car Series, the American Le Mans Series and the current WeatherTech SportsCar Championship.

Several nations have hosted a race, including the United States, Canada, Mexico, Australia, Spain, Germany and the United Kingdom. Daytona International Speedway has hosted the series in 50 of its 52 seasons, the most of any track. The 12 tracks which will host a race in the 2020 season, are listed in bold.

See also
 List of IMSA GT Championship circuits
 List of American Le Mans Series circuits
 List of World Sportscar Championship circuits
 List of Can-Am Challenge Cup circuits

References

International Motor Sports Association
IMSA
IMSA SportsCar Championship
IMSA SportsCar Championship